The place name Middleport may refer to:

Canada
 Middleport, Ontario
United Kingdom,
 Middleport, Staffordshire in England
United States
 Middleport, New York
 Middleport, Ohio
 Middleport, Pennsylvania
 Middleport, Wisconsin